"Outside of Me" is a song by Australian band Killing Heidi. It was the second and final single released from their second album, Present (2002). The single is available in two parts, with the same track listing but slightly different artwork. "Outside of Me" was released on 23 September 2002 and peaked at number 12 on the Australian Singles Chart.

Track listing
CD single
 "Outside of Me"
 "Buttup"
 "Taxi Driver"
 "Wartorn Way"
 "Heavensent"

Charts

Weekly charts

Certification

References

2002 singles
2002 songs
Killing Heidi songs
Songs written by Ella Hooper
Songs written by Jesse Hooper
Warner Records singles